The Congregation of Bishops and Regulars was a department of the Roman Curia that, beginning in the late 16th century, managed the diocesan bishops and those individuals, both male and female, and establishments associated with religious orders. It was also concerned with the relationship, at times contentious, between the two. The term regulars derives from the Latin regula meaning rule; it refers to those religious who follow a rule, as the Benedictines follow the Rule of St. Benedict. Its competence changed over time as the various dicasteries of the Roman Curia competed for jurisdiction, and by the 19th century included new institutions and their rules, the erection of monasteries and convents, granting transfers and leaves from such institutions, and their sale of property. It handled criminal cases as well. As late as 1903, this Congregation was described as "perhaps the most important congregation of the Roman Curia".

Pope Gregory XIII established a dicastery to address the issues raised by bishops in 1576 and his successor Pope Sixtus V erected a parallel structure for regulars in 1586. In 1593 Pope Clement VIII gave the two curial departments a common prefect. By 1601 they were known by the single name. Pope Pius X suppressed the Congregation of Bishops and Regulars on 29 June 1908 by the apostolic constitution Sapienti consilio, which accomplished an overall reorganization of the Curia, modifying its structure and the competencies of its congregations, tribunals, and lesser offices.

References

External links
 

 

Former departments of the Roman Curia
Congregations of the Roman Curia
1576 establishments in the Papal States
Religious organizations established in the 1570s
1908 disestablishments in Vatican City
Religious organizations disestablished in the 1900s